Henry Marsh (died 10 June 1772, Greenwich) was an English naval officer who served in the Royal Navy from 20 January 1740 until his death on 10 June 1772.

He led the naval expedition during the British Capture of Senegal in 1758.

References

Year of birth missing
1772 deaths
Royal Navy personnel of the Seven Years' War
Place of birth missing